The 1992 Stanley Cup playoffs, the playoff tournament of the National Hockey League (NHL) began on April 18, after the conclusion of the 1991–92 NHL season. It was the 100th anniversary of the first awarding of the Stanley Cup, and it was won by the Pittsburgh Penguins, defeating the Chicago Blackhawks.

The 1992 playoffs saw history being made, as for the first time ever, all four division winners were eliminated in the same round. In the division finals, the Norris Division champion Detroit Red Wings were swept by the Chicago Blackhawks in four straight games, and the Montreal Canadiens, who had won the Adams Division, suffered the same fate at the hands of the Boston Bruins. The Pittsburgh Penguins eliminated the Patrick Division titlists, the New York Rangers, in six games, while the Vancouver Canucks, the Smythe Division toppers, fell to the Edmonton Oilers, also in six games.

A record 54 games were played in the first round, with six of the eight series going the full seven games, and the other two going six games (the Oilers' win over the Kings and the Blackhawks' win over the Blues). Three of the eight series featured teams coming back from 3–1 series deficits (Detroit against Minnesota, Pittsburgh against Washington, and Vancouver against Winnipeg), the most in a single playoff year; this record was equaled in 2003. Conversely, five series ended in sweeps, the most in a single playoffs since the modern format of four rounds of best-of-7 series was introduced in 1987.

This was the last year the Hartford Whalers and Minnesota North Stars qualified for the playoffs. The franchises would not reach the post-season again until 1999 and 1994 respectively. By the time each franchise reached the playoffs again, they were known as the Carolina Hurricanes and the Dallas Stars, respectively.

Video replay was used to decide a playoff game for the first time in game six of the Detroit–Minnesota division semifinal. Sergei Fedorov of the Red Wings appeared to hit the crossbar behind Minnesota goalie Jon Casey during the first overtime, but after the North Stars iced the puck immediately afterward, referee Rob Shick called for a video review, which determined that the puck had entered the goal just below the crossbar and caromed off the frame at the back of the net. Fedorov was awarded the goal, giving the Red Wings a series-tying victory.

Playoff seeds

The following teams qualified for the playoffs:

Prince of Wales Conference

Adams Division
 Montreal Canadiens, Adams Division champions – 93 points
 Boston Bruins – 84 points
 Buffalo Sabres – 74 points
 Hartford Whalers – 65 points

Patrick Division
 New York Rangers, Patrick Division champions, Prince of Wales Conference regular season champions, Presidents' Trophy winners – 105 points
 Washington Capitals – 98 points
 Pittsburgh Penguins – 87 points (39 wins)
 New Jersey Devils – 87 points (38 wins)

Clarence Campbell Conference

Norris Division
 Detroit Red Wings, Norris Division champions, Clarence Campbell Conference regular season champions – 98 points
 Chicago Blackhawks – 87 points
 St. Louis Blues – 83 points
 Minnesota North Stars – 70 points

Smythe Division
 Vancouver Canucks, Smythe Division champions – 96 points
 Los Angeles Kings – 84 points
 Edmonton Oilers – 82 points
 Winnipeg Jets – 81 points

Playoff bracket

Division Semifinals

Prince of Wales Conference

(A1) Montreal Canadiens vs. (A4) Hartford Whalers

This was the fifth playoff series meeting between these two teams. Montreal won all four prior playoff meetings, including their most recent meeting in the 1989 Adams Division Semifinals in a four-game sweep. This was the final time that the Hartford Whalers qualified for the playoffs; the next time that this franchise made the playoffs was in 1999 as the Carolina Hurricanes. Game six was the final playoff game played at the Hartford Civic Center.

(A2) Boston Bruins vs. (A3) Buffalo Sabres
This was the fifth playoff series meeting between these two teams. Boston won all four prior playoff meetings, including their most recent meeting in the 1989 Adams Division Semifinals in five games.

(P1) New York Rangers vs. (P4) New Jersey Devils
This was the first playoff series meeting between these two teams.

(P2) Washington Capitals vs. (P3) Pittsburgh Penguins
This was the second overall playoff meeting in as many years between these two teams. Pittsburgh won last year's Patrick Division Finals in five games.

Clarence Campbell Conference

(N1) Detroit Red Wings vs. (N4) Minnesota North Stars

This was the first playoff meeting between these two teams.

This was the final playoff series played by the Minnesota North Stars. The next time that the Stars franchise made the playoffs was in 1994 when they were known as the Dallas Stars. Game six was the final playoff game played at the Met Center.

(N2) Chicago Blackhawks vs. (N3) St. Louis Blues
This was the eighth playoff series meeting between these two teams. Chicago won six of the previous seven series, including their most recent meeting in the 1990 Norris Division Finals in seven games.

(S1) Vancouver Canucks vs. (S4) Winnipeg Jets

This was the first playoff series between these two teams.

(S2) Los Angeles Kings vs. (S3) Edmonton Oilers
This was the seventh playoff meeting between these two teams and were meeting for the fourth straight year. Edmonton won four of the previous six meetings, including last year's Smythe Division Finals in six games.

Division Finals

Prince of Wales Conference

(A1) Montreal Canadiens vs. (A2) Boston Bruins

This was the 27th playoff series meeting between these two teams. Montreal lead the all-time playoff meetings 21–5 against Boston. This was also the ninth consecutive year Boston and Montreal had met in the playoffs, an NHL record that still stands. Boston won last year's Adams Division Finals in seven games.

(P1) New York Rangers vs. (P3) Pittsburgh Penguins
This was the second playoff meeting between these two teams. Pittsburgh won the only previous meeting in a four-game sweep in the 1989 Patrick Division Semifinals.

Clarence Campbell Conference

(N1) Detroit Red Wings vs. (N2) Chicago Blackhawks
This was the 13th playoff series meeting between these two teams. Entering the series, Chicago led the all-time meetings 7–5. Their most recent meeting was won by Chicago in six games in the 1989 Norris Division Semifinals.

(S1) Vancouver Canucks vs. (S3) Edmonton Oilers
This was the second playoff series meeting between these two teams. Edmonton won the only previous meeting in a three-game sweep in the 1986 Smythe Division Semifinals.

Conference Finals

Prince of Wales Conference Final

(P3) Pittsburgh Penguins vs. (A2) Boston Bruins
This was the third playoff series meeting between these two teams. Boston won two of the previous three meetings. This was a rematch of last year's Prince of Wales Conference Final, which Pittsburgh won in six games.

Clarence Campbell Conference Final

(N2) Chicago Blackhawks vs. (S3) Edmonton Oilers
This was the fourth playoff series meeting between these two teams. Edmonton won all three previous meetings, the most recent of which they won in six games in the 1990 Clarence Campbell Conference Final.

Stanley Cup Finals

This was the second playoff series meeting between these two teams. Chicago won the only previous meeting in a four-game sweep in the 1972 Stanley Cup Quarterfinals.

Playoff statistics

Skaters
These are the top ten skaters based on points.

Goaltenders
This is a combined table of the top five goaltenders based on goals against average and the top five goaltenders based on save percentage, with at least 420 minutes played. The table is sorted by GAA, and the criteria for inclusion are bolded.

References

See also
List of Stanley Cup champions

playoffs
Stanley Cup playoffs